Bellshill  is one of the twenty-one wards used to elect members of the North Lanarkshire Council. Created in 2007, it originally returned three councillors, covering part of Bellshill (including the Orbiston, Hattonrigg, Shirrell and West End neighbourhoods but not Milnwood, Thorndean, the town centre east of Hamilton Road / North Road, nor Mossend), with the northern boundary at the A8 and the western boundary at the A725 bypass; much of Strathclyde Country Park (nominally in Motherwell) was also assigned to this ward.

A 2017 national review caused the territory to be altered, with a minor change within central Bellshill moving the eastern boundary to Motherwell Road, and a shift of the western boundary further towards Viewpark to encompass the Fallside neighbourhood (although the majority of built-upon land in this area is the unpopulated Righead Industrial Estate). These changes caused an increase in population, with one additional seat allocated. In 2019, the ward had a population of 14,969.

Councillors

Election results

2022 election

2017 election

2012 election

2007 election

References

Wards of North Lanarkshire
Bellshill